Stuart "Skip" Schoolnik  (born July 17, 1945) is a film director, producer and editor who received his degree from the University of Connecticut and resides in California. He currently serves as the post production producer for WGN's Salem.

Schoolnik has directed such movies as Hide and Go Shriek as well as episodes of the television shows Angel and Beyond Belief: Fact or Fiction. The character of Skip was actually a tribute to Schoolnik, who directed five episodes for Angel. Schoolnik has also edited several movies and television shows such as the TV version of Halloween, Halloween II, Knight Rider 2010, and Buffy the Vampire Slayer.

As either co-producer or associate producer, he has worked on many projects including Angel, Beyond Belief: Fact or Fiction, Hollywood Confidential and Kung Fu: The Movie.

In recent years, Schoolnik has worked as associate producer on AMC's The Walking Dead, associate producer on the BBC/Starz show Torchwood, post production producer on TNT's Legends and post production producer on Fox's K-Ville.

References

External links
 

1945 births
American Cinema Editors
American television directors
Television producers from Ohio
University of Connecticut alumni
Living people
Businesspeople from Columbus, Ohio
Film directors from Ohio
Film producers from Ohio
American film editors